Lyon-Saint-Paul is a railway station in the 5th arrondissement of Lyon, France. It is located in the area of the same name at the northern end of the Vieux Lyon quarter, between the base of the Fourvière hill and the river Saône. The station is a terminus for local trains serving the western suburbs of the city.

Since September 2012 the station is the city terminus of the Western Lyon Tram-Train, connecting Lyon with its western suburbs.

History 
The railway station underwent significant renovations between 2008 and 2012. In addition to upgrades to passenger amenities, the 28 apartments on the second, third and fourth floors were renovated and re-opened in 2013.

Services
The station is served by two Tram-Train services operated by TER Auvergne-Rhône-Alpes.

Tram-Train services (TER) Brignais - Lyon-St-Paul
Tram-Train services (TER) Sain-Bel - L'Arbresle - Tassin - Lyon-St-Paul

Gallery

See also 

 Tramways in Lyon
 Transport in Rhône-Alpes
 Tram-train de l'ouest lyonnais
 TER Auvergne-Rhône-Alpes

References

5th arrondissement of Lyon
Saint-Paul
Railway stations in France opened in 1876